FC Memmingen is a German association football club based in Memmingen, Bavaria.

History
The team was formed on 30 May 1907 as the football department of the gymnastics club Memminger Turnvereins 1859 and became independent in the fall of that year. They re-joined TV on 14 February 1919 before regaining their independence in March 1924 as FC Memmingen 07 Verein für Rasensport und Leibesübungen. The association later adopted its current name, FC Memmingen 07 Verein für Leibesübungen.

Prior to World War II the team captured seven local titles at various levels of play. In 1933 it took part in qualification play for the Gauliga Bayern, one of sixteen new top-flight divisions formed in the re-organization of German football under the Third Reich, but dropped a 2:3 decision to BC Augsburg.

FCM made a first appearance in the top-league of Bavaria in 1953, when, after finishing second in the 2nd Amateurliga Schwaben, the club was admitted to the new Amateurliga Südbayern (III). Its first season there was not very successful and the team found itself relegated after finishing last. It bounced back with a 2nd Amateurliga title in 1955 and a finish at the top of its promotion group. Two good seasons followed with top-five finishes but in 1958, the club was relegated once again. It finished on top of the 2nd Amateurliga once again in 1958, after having to play a decider against TSV Göggingen, which it won.

The two following seasons in the Bayernliga were difficult and the club was relegated once more in 1961. The team remained in the 2nd Amateurliga and qualified for the new tier-four Landesliga Bayern-Süd in 1963.

After a brief drop to the tier-five Bezirksliga from 1966 to 1968, the club recovered and, by winning the Landesliga in 1970, returned to the now single-division Amateurliga Bayern. The team was to remain at this level for the following seventeen years, quite an achievement, but, except for 1980, when it came third, it never finished in the top half of the table. The 1987–88 and 1988–89 seasons were spent in the Landesliga but then the club returned to the Bayernliga once more for the next thirteen seasons.

The club's most successful season came in 1996–97, when they came within a hairsbreadth of advancing to the Regionalliga Süd (III). Memmingen held a 3:2 lead in a promotion playoff versus Kickers Offenbach when the stadium floodlights failed, bringing the match to a premature halt. Offenbach won the subsequent re-play and advanced to the Regionalliga.

After another relegation in 2002 and a one-year stint in the Landesliga, the club returned to the Bayernliga, achieving some good results.

In 2007, FC Memmingen celebrated its centennial and inaugurated its refurbished Stadion an der Bodenseestraße with an Allgäu derby match against FC Kempten in front of 6,650 spectators. The club had the best support in the Bayernliga the 2007–08 season with over 1600 spectators per game.

The FC Memmingen holds the record for Oberliga Bayern seasons with its 37th in 2009–10 and also leads the overall table of this league. The club won the Bayernliga title in 2009–10 and thereby earned promotion to the Regionalliga Süd for the first time. In 2012 the club became part of the new Regionalliga Bayern where it plays today, finishing 7th in 2015.

Reserve team
The club's reserve team, FC Memmingen II, played in the Bezirksoberliga Schwaben (VI) in the 2007–08 season, coming second at the end of season. This finish qualified them for the promotion round, where they lost both games and therefore would have remained in the Bezirksoberliga but due to the third placed team from the Landesliga gaining promotion, too, the FCM II was also promoted. Outclassed in the Landesliga, the team had to return to the Bezirksoberliga immediately.

At the end of the 2011–12 season the team qualified for the newly expanded Landesliga after finishing eighth in the Bezirksoberliga and defeating TSV Neusäß in the promotion round.

Current squad

Honours
The club's honours:

League
 Bayernliga (V)
 Champions: 2010
 Landesliga Bayern-Süd (IV-V)
 Champions: (2) 1970, 2003
 Runners-up: 1989
 2nd Amateurliga Schwaben (IV)
 Champions: (2) 1955, 1958
 Bezirksoberliga Schwaben (VI)
 Runners-up: 2008‡

Cup
 Schwaben Cup
 Winners: (3) 1958, 1967, 1976
 Runners-up: (5) 1972, 1993, 1994, 1998, 2006

Youth
 Bavarian Under 19 championship
 Runners-up: 2003
 Bavarian Under 15 championship
 Runners-up: 1998
 ‡ Reserve team

Recent managers
Recent managers of the club:

FC Memmingen seasons
The recent season-by-season performance of the club:

FC Memmingen

The Bayernliga was officially called Amateurliga Bayern until 1978, then Amateur Oberliga Bayern till 1994 and Oberliga Bayern after that.

FC Memmingen II

With the introduction of the Bezirksoberligas in 1988 as the new fifth tier, below the Landesligas, all leagues below dropped one tier. With the introduction of the Regionalligas in 1994 and the 3. Liga in 2008 as the new third tier, below the 2. Bundesliga, all leagues below dropped one tier. With the establishment of the Regionalliga Bayern as the new fourth tier in Bavaria in 2012 the Bayernliga was split into a northern and a southern division, the number of Landesligas expanded from three to five and the Bezirksoberligas abolished. All leagues from the Bezirksligas onwards were elevated one tier.

Key

References

Sources
Grüne, Hardy (2001). Vereinslexikon. Kassel: AGON Sportverlag

External links

Official team site 
FC Memmingen at Weltfussball.de
Das deutsche Fußball-Archiv historical German domestic league tables (in German)

Football clubs in Germany
Football clubs in Bavaria
Association football clubs established in 1907
Football in Swabia (Bavaria)
Memmingen
1907 establishments in Germany